Xiphares (c. 85 – 65 BC) was, according to Appian, a Pontic prince who was the son of King Mithridates VI of Pontus from his concubine and later wife Stratonice of Pontus. During the Mithridatic Wars, Stratonice turned over Mithridates' stronghold at Coenum, which had been entrusted to her protection, to the Roman forces under Pompey. In revenge, Mithridates had Xiphares killed, leaving his corpse unburied.

References 
 A. Duggan, He Died Old, Mithridates Eupator, King of Pontus (1974)

80s BC births
65 BC deaths
Iranian people of Greek descent
1st-century BC Iranian people
Ancient Persian people
Mithridatic dynasty